Peik Gästrin (born 6 July 1934) is a Finnish sailor. He competed in the 5.5 Metre event at the 1960 Summer Olympics.

References

External links
 

1934 births
Living people
Finnish male sailors (sport)
Olympic sailors of Finland
Sailors at the 1960 Summer Olympics – 5.5 Metre
Sportspeople from Helsinki